Xavier Thévenard is a French elite athlete who specialises in trail and mountain running. He won the Ultra-Trail du Mont-Blanc in 2013, 2015 and 2018.

Biography 

A native of the ski resort Les Plans d'Hotonnes, and a former cross-country skier and biathlete, he started running as physical training over the summer months, before entering his first ultra running competitions in 2010.

He is the only athlete to have achieved the Ultra-Trail du Mont-Blanc Grand Slam with victories in the four individual races:

 UTMB (170 km) in 2013, 2015 and 2018
 CCC (99 km) in 2010
 TDS (119 km) in 2014
 OCC (55 km) in 2016

In 2017, he won the Mont-Blanc 80 km.
In 2019, he won Ultra-Trail Mt. Fuji (UTMF) and Mont-Blanc 90 km.

Record of achievements

References 

1988 births
Living people
People from Nantua
French male runners
Sportspeople from Ain